Harold Horsfall Hilton (12 January 1869 – 5 May 1942) was an English amateur golfer of the late 19th and early 20th centuries. He won The Open Championship twice, The Amateur Championship four times, and the U.S. Amateur Championship once.

Biography

Hilton was born in West Kirby and attended West Buckland School in Devon. In 1892, he won The Open Championship at Muirfield, becoming the second amateur to do so. He won again in 1897 at his home club, Royal Liverpool Golf Club, Hoylake. The only other amateurs who have won the Open Championship are John Ball and Bobby Jones. Hilton's autobiography My Golfing Reminiscences was published in 1907.

Hilton also won The Amateur Championship on four occasions, including 1911, when he became the only British player to win the British and U.S. Amateurs in the same year.  Hilton retired with a 99–29 record (77.3%) at The Amateur Championship.

From 1905 to 1915, Hilton was a member at Ashford Manor Golf Club in Middlesex (now Surrey), the club having been incorporated in 1902. In 1912, he played a major part in designing Ferndown Golf Club in Dorset which became an Open Championship qualifying course and one of the top 100 courses in the UK.

Death
Hilton died on 5 May 1942 at Westcote, Gloucestershire, England, at age 73.

Legacy
Hilton was also a golf writer. Hilton was the co-author in 1912 of The Royal and Ancient Game of Golf with Garden Smith. The Donovan and Jerris golf book bibliography says about the book, "Quite simply stated, Hilton and Smith's "The Royal and Ancient Game of Golf" is one of the most magnificent books in the library of golf. Well-illustrated and sweeping in content…" He was also the first editor of Golf Monthly, and also the editor of Golf Illustrated. He also designed many courses and was inducted into the World Golf Hall of Fame in 1978.

Tournament wins (47)
Note: This list may be incomplete
1889 Royal Liverpool Summer Lubbock Gold Medal, Royal Liverpool Autumn Kennard Gold Medal, Royal Liverpool St. Andrew's Gold Cross Medal, West Lancashire Golf Club Challenge Gold Medal, West Lancashire Golf Club Mayor's Prize, West Lancashire Golf Club St. Andrew's Challenge Gold Cross Medal
1891 Royal Liverpool Spring Club Gold Medal, Royal Liverpool Summer Lubbock Gold Medal, Birkdale Golf Club Crowther Cup
1892 The Open Championship, Formby Cullen Silver Medal, Royal Liverpool Summer Lubbock Gold Medal, West Lancashire Golf Club Gold Medal, West Lancashire Golf Club Silver Challenge Cup, West Lancashire Golf Club St. Andrew's Gold Cross, West Lancashire Golf Club Easter Challenge Cup, Southport Golf Club Pilkington Centenary Gold Medal,
1893 St. George's Challenge Cup, Formby Prestwich Gold Medal, Formby Cullen Silver Medal, Royal Liverpool Spring Club Gold Medal, Royal Liverpool Spring Connaught Challenge Star Medal, Royal Liverpool Autumn Kennard Gold Medal, West Lancashire Golf Club Cookson Prize, West Lancashire Golf Club Silver Cup, West Lancashire Golf Club St. Andrew's Challenge Gold Cross Medal, Lytham & St. Anne's Golf Club Silver Iron, Lytham & St. Anne's Golf Club Thistleton Medal
1894 St. George's Challenge Cup
1897 The Open Championship, Irish Amateur Open Championship
1899 Formby Prestwich Gold Medal, Formby Cullen Silver Medal, Formby St. Andrew's Medal, Royal Liverpool Spring Club Gold Medal, Royal Liverpool Spring Connaught Challenge Star Medal, Royal Liverpool Autumn Kennard Gold Medal, Royal Liverpool Milligan St. Andrew's Gold Cross
1900 The Amateur Championship, Irish Amateur Open Championship
1901 The Amateur Championship, Irish Amateur Open Championship
1902 Irish Amateur Open Championship
1911 The Amateur Championship, U.S. Amateur
1913 The Amateur Championship
1914 Golf Illustrated Gold Vase

Major championships

Professional wins (2)

Amateur wins (5)

Results timeline

Note: Hilton only played in The Open Championship, U.S. Amateur, and The Amateur Championship.

LA = Low amateur
M = Medalist
NYF = Tournament not yet founded
NT = No tournament
CUT = missed the half-way cut
WD = withdrew
"T" indicates a tie for a place
R256, R128, R64, R32, R16, QF, SF = Round in which player lost in match play

Team appearances
England–Scotland Amateur Match (representing England): 1902, 1903 (winners), 1904, 1905, 1906, 1907, 1908, 1909, 1910 (winners), 1911, 1912
Coronation Match (representing the Amateurs): 1911

References

English male golfers
Amateur golfers
Winners of men's major golf championships
Golf writers and broadcasters
World Golf Hall of Fame inductees
People educated at West Buckland School
1869 births
1942 deaths